Edgar Sanderson (16 March 1874 – after 1898) was an English footballer who played for Jarrow, Notts County and Stoke.

Career statistics
Source:

References

English footballers
Jarrow F.C. players
Notts County F.C. players
Stoke City F.C. players
English Football League players
Year of death missing
1874 births
Association football fullbacks